Châu Giang is former district of Hải Hưng province. It was formed on February 24, 1979, from merger of Khoái Châu district and 14 communes of Văn Giang district.

References 

Former districts of Vietnam